In the 1975–76 season, West Ham United finished in 18th position in the First Division and reached the final of the European Cup Winners' Cup.

Season summary
West Ham United were unbeaten in their first nine League games of the 1975–76 season and occupied second place in the autumn of 1975. However, in an abrupt downturn in form they collected just eight points and won only one League match after Christmas, leaving them in 18th, only six points away from the relegation places. Their FA Cup defence ended in the third round, when they lost at home to Liverpool.

West Ham saved their best form for their third foray into European competition. Despite failing to win any of their away fixtures, they reached the final of the Cup Winners' Cup, losing 4–2 to Anderlecht.

League table

Results

Football League First Division

Charity Shield

FA Cup

League Cup

European Cup Winners' Cup

Players

References

1975-76
English football clubs 1975–76 season
1975 sports events in London
1976 sports events in London